Nicolás Eduardo Lindley López (November 16, 1908 – May 3, 1995) was a Peruvian military commander who headed the military government in Peru for several months in 1963 and served as the 48th President of Peru (2nd President of the Military Junta).

Biography 
Lindley was born in Lima in 1908 to an upper-class family of English descent. He studied at the Anglo-Peruvian School (Colegio San Andrés). In 1926, he entered the Chorrillos Military School, where he obtained his doctorate in 1930. Lindley had a successful career within the military, and in 1960 he became general commander of the Peruvian Army.

On July 18 1962, Lindley launched a military coup together with Ricardo Pérez Godoy against the democratically elected President of Peru Manuel Prado, in order to prevent the election of Manuel A. Odría as president by Congress on July 28, 1962, based on his agreement between Víctor Raúl Haya de la Torre, who placed first in the election, but the military issued a veto against him. They installed a military government, initially headed by Pérez with Lindley as the minister of defense. The junta's main goal was to organize new elections and transfer power to a newly elected government. When Pérez showed an inclination to stay in power for longer than originally foreseen, he was overthrown by Lindley on March 3, 1963. Lindley stayed in power until July 28 that year when the election winner Fernando Belaúnde took over the presidency.

From 1964 to 1975, Lindley served as the Peruvian ambassador to Spain. He then retired from politics and military life, and later returned to Peru, where he lived until his death at the age of 86.

References

External links
 Paper Money issue by the Lindley Administration

1908 births
1995 deaths
People from Lima
Peruvian generals
Prime Ministers of Peru
Presidents of Peru
Peruvian people of English descent
Ambassadors of Peru to Spain
Chorrillos Military School alumni
Leaders who took power by coup